In distributed computing, General Inter-ORB Protocol (GIOP) is the message protocol by which object request brokers (ORBs) communicate in CORBA. Standards associated with the protocol are maintained by the Object Management Group (OMG). The current version of GIOP is 2.0.2. The GIOP architecture provides several concrete protocols, including:

 Internet InterORB Protocol (IIOP) — The Internet Inter-Orb Protocol is an implementation of the GIOP for use over the Internet, and provides a mapping between GIOP messages and the TCP/IP layer.
 SSL InterORB Protocol (SSLIOP) — SSLIOP is IIOP over SSL, providing encryption and authentication.
 HyperText InterORB Protocol (HTIOP) — HTIOP is IIOP over HTTP, providing transparent proxy bypassing.
 Zipped InterORB Protocol (ZIOP)  — A zipped version of GIOP that reduces the bandwidth usage

Environment Specific Inter-ORB Protocols 
As an alternative to GIOP, CORBA includes the concept of an Environment Specific Inter-ORB Protocol (ESIOP). While GIOP is defined to meet general-purpose needs of most CORBA implementations, an ESIOP attempts to address special requirements. For example, an ESIOP might use an alternative protocol encoding to improve efficiency over networks with limited bandwidth or high latency. ESIOPs can also be used to layer CORBA on top of some non-CORBA technology stack, such as Distributed Computing Environment (DCE).

DCE Common Inter-ORB Protocol (DCE-CIOP) is an ESIOP for use in DCE. It maps CORBA to DCE RPC and CDR (Command Data Representation). DCE-CIOP is defined in chapter 16 of the CORBA 2.6.1 standard.

Messages

Further reading

See also
DIIOP

References

Distributed computing